American Idol may refer to:

American Idol, original series on Fox from 2002 to 2016
American Idol: The Search for a Superstar, title of season 1 in 2002 
American Idol: The Farewell Season, title of final season 15 in 2016
American Idol (ABC TV series), revived series on ABC starting 2018
Latin American Idol

Various
The American Idol Experience, a theme park attraction at Disney's Hollywood Studios at the Walt Disney World Resort
American Idol Rewind, syndicated television series that ran from September 30, 2006, to May 15, 2010
American Idol (video game)
American Idols LIVE! Tour 2007
American Idol: Greatest Moments, first American Idol soundtrack, with music from the first season of American Idol.

See also
Idol (disambiguation)
List of American Idol finalists
List of American Idol episodes
List of American Idol alumni album sales in the United States
List of American Idol alumni single sales in the United States
List of American Idol Hot 100 singles
American Idol contestants discography
American Idol controversies
American Idol compilation series